So Fresh: The Hits of Summer 2004 Plus the Best of 2003 is a compilation album featuring songs from various artists in many genres.  Songs were picked from some of the most popular during the summer of 2003, plus a few of the most popular songs from 2003. The album was released on 1 December 2003. Despite Avril Lavigne being listed on the album artwork as a featured artist there is no song by that artist on this release.

Track listing
CD 1
 Australian Idol – The Final 12 – "Rise Up" (3:47)
 The Black Eyed Peas – "Where Is the Love?" (4:33)
 Delta Goodrem – "Not Me, Not I" (4:25)
 Dido – "White Flag" (3:38)
 Justin Timberlake – "Señorita" (4:56)
 Pink – "Trouble" (3:13)
 Kelly Clarkson – "Low" (3:29)
 Holly Valance – "State of Mind" (3:19)
 Evanescence – "Going Under" (3:35)
 Eminem – "Business" (4:13)
 50 Cent – "21 Questions" (3:45)
 R. Kelly – "Thoia Thoing" (3:43)
 Big Brovaz – "Baby Boy" (3:20)
 Elvis Presley – "Rubberneckin'" (Paul Oakenfold Remix) (3:29)
 Junior Senior – "Move Your Feet" (3:00)
 Gareth Gates – "Sunshine" (3:37)
 Maroon 5 – "Harder to Breathe" (2:54)
 Stella One Eleven – "Out There Somewhere" (4:10)
 The Ataris – "The Boys of Summer" (4:19)
 Nickelback – "Someday" (3:27)

CD 2
 Powderfinger – "(Baby I've Got You) On My Mind" (3:21)
 Christina Aguilera – "Fighter" (4:07)
 INXS – "I Get Up" (3:29)
 Mýa – "My Love Is Like...Wo" (3:29)
Jay-Z featuring Beyoncé – "'03 Bonnie & Clyde" (3:25)
 t.A.T.u. – "Not Gonna Get Us" (3:37)
 David Campbell – "When She's Gone" (3:34)
 Thicke – "When I Get You Alone" (3:36)
 Something for Kate – "Song for a Sleepwalker" (3:53)
 Sandrine – "Trigger" (3:45)
 Lo-Tel – "Angel" (3:36)
 Jason Nevins presents U.K.N.Y. featuring Holly James – "I'm in Heaven" (3:37)
 Puddle of Mudd – "She Hates Me" (3:28)
 1200 Techniques – "Where Ur At" (3:52)
 Kurtis Mantronik presents Chamonix – "How Did You Know (77 Strings)" (3:31)
 Candice Alley – "Dream the Day Away" (Four on the Floor Mix) (4:05)
 Duncan James – "The Speed of Life" (3:54)
 Nikki Webster – "Dancing in the Street" (3:51)
 Ja Rule featuring Ashanti – "Mesmerize" (4:39)
 Counting Crows featuring Vanessa Carlton – "Big Yellow Taxi" (3:46)

Charts

See also
So Fresh
2004 in music

References

External links
 Latest Albums from So Fresh

So Fresh albums
2004 compilation albums
2004 in Australian music